Aan boord van de 'Sabina'  is a 1920 Dutch silent film directed by Theo Frenkel.

Cast
Frits Bouwmeester
Lily Bouwmeester
Frits Engels
Dio Huysmans
Kees Lageman

Summary 
The skipper of the barge Sabina, who is also the father of an eighteen-year-old daughter, hires a new mate. The two youngsters soon feel attracted to each other. Another admirer gives the girl an expensive gift. This makes the mate gloomy, because he doesn't have enough money to do the same. Theft seems to be the solution to his problem, but the result is that he ends up in prison. The skipper has to sail on and his daughter tows the heavy boat through the canals. After six months in prison, the mate returns to the Sabina, where the skipper and his daughter welcome him.

External links 
 
 Aan boord van de Sabina Summary

Dutch silent feature films
1920 films
Dutch black-and-white films
Films directed by Theo Frenkel